The Erebini are a tribe of moths in the family Erebidae.

Genera
Erebus
Erygia
Lygniodes

References

 
Erebinae
Moth tribes